Steele Von Hoff (born 31 December 1987) is an Australian road racing cyclist, who most recently rode for Australian amateur team InForm TMX MAKE. In 2018, Von Hoff won the gold medal in the road race at the Commonwealth Games.

Career

In 2011, Von Hoff and  teammate Nathan Haas dominated Australia's domestic National Road Series. The two riders entered the 2011 Herald Sun Tour, a race featuring numerous UCI ProTeams. Von Hoff progressed from third on stage two to second on stage three; Haas won the general classification.

On 24 August 2012, Von Hoff finished third on the third stage of the Danmark Rundt, a 2.HC event forming part of the UCI Europe Tour.

Von Hoff joined  on a full-time basis for the 2013 and 2014 seasons. On 10 January 2014, Von Hoff won the National Criterium Championships. In December 2014 Von Hoff was announced as a member of 's roster for the 2015 season. At the 2015 Tour Down Under, Von Hoff competed as part of the UniSA-Australia team. During the fourth stage of the 2015 Tour Down Under, Von Hoff won the stage. In the autumn of 2015  announced that Von Hoff would ride for them in 2016.

He won gold at the 2018 Commonwealth Games road race.

Personal life
Born in Mornington, Victoria, Von Hoff currently resides in Moorooduc, Victoria, Australia.

Major results
Sources:

2011
 3rd  Road race, Oceania Road Cycling Championships
 7th Overall Tour of Wellington
2012
 Tour de Guadeloupe
1st Stages 2 & 9
 1st Stage 5 Tour du Loir-et-Cher
 1st Stage 6 Olympia's Tour
 2nd Kattekoers
 3rd Criterium, National Road Championships
 5th Down Under Classic
 6th Overall World Ports Classic
 10th Japan Cup
2013
 National Road Championships
2nd Criterium
3rd Road race
 7th Down Under Classic
2014
 1st  Criterium, National Road Championships
2015
 1st  Criterium, National Road Championships
 1st Rutland–Melton CiCLE Classic
 1st Jock Wadley Memorial Road Race
 1st Stage 4 Tour Down Under
 3rd London Nocturne
 5th Overall Bay Classic Series
2016
 1st Stage 1 Tour of Norway 
 1st Stage 1 Sibiu Cycling Tour
 5th Omloop Mandel-Leie-Schelde
 8th Grote Prijs Stad Zottegem
 9th London–Surrey Classic
 10th Rund um Köln
2017
 2nd Overall Ronde van Midden-Nederland
1st Stage 1 (TTT)
 8th Rutland–Melton International CiCLE Classic
2018
 1st  Road race, Commonwealth Games
 1st Points classification Herald Sun Tour
 7th Cadel Evans Great Ocean Road Race

References

External links

 
 Garmin-Sharp: Steele Von Hoff
 
 

Australian male cyclists
Tour de Guadeloupe stage winners
1987 births
Living people
Commonwealth Games medallists in cycling
Commonwealth Games gold medallists for Australia
Cyclists at the 2018 Commonwealth Games
People from Mornington, Victoria
Sportsmen from Victoria (Australia)
Medallists at the 2018 Commonwealth Games